Daucus pusillus is a species of wild carrot known by the common names American wild carrot and rattle-snake-weed. Its Latin name means "little carrot", or "tiny carrot". It is similar in appearance to other species and subspecies of wild carrot, with umbels of white or pinkish flowers.

The taproots are small, edible carrots. This is a common plant found in the Southern United States and along the west coast of North America from Baja California to British Columbia; as an example occurrence in Baja California, D. pusillus occurs in association with Mimulus aridus and Adiantum jordanii. It should not be confused with Conium maculatum, which is highly poisonous.

References

External links
 Species account
 Photo gallery

Daucus
Edible Apiaceae
Flora of Baja California
Flora of Oregon
Flora of California
Flora of the Sierra Nevada (United States)
Flora of the California desert regions
Flora without expected TNC conservation status